Tim Schneider (born 1 September 1997) is a German professional basketball player for Alba Berlin of the Basketball Bundesliga (BBL).

In 2016, Schneider reached fourth place with the German U20 national team at the European Championships in Finland. In the U20 European Championship in the summer of 2017 he came up with the German team to seventh place overall, scoring an average of 5.3 points per game. In November 2018, he was named to the roster of the German men's national team for the first time in his career. On 17 July 2020, Schneider sign a two-year contract extension with Alba Berlin.

References

External links
 German BBL Profile

1997 births
Living people
Alba Berlin players
German men's basketball players
Power forwards (basketball)
Basketball players from Berlin